Mariana Garza Alardín, (born October 19, 1970 in Mexico City, Mexico) is a Mexican singer and actress.

Biography 
Mariana Garza is the daughter of Ana Silvia Garza, (and the granddaughter of Ramiro Garza and Mexican poet Carmen Alardín). She has a brother Sebastián. 

Her first work was "Elisa" in 1979. Next year, Mariana debuted on theatre in the play "La Maravilla de crecer". Her success started in 1982, when Mariana joined the band "Timbiriche". 

In 1987,with the greater success of the band, Mariana decided to leave to concentrate on her career as an actress. 

Mariana has performed in several soap operas such as "Flor y Canela" and Alcanzar Una Estrella, her big success. As a TV host, Mariana participated in the popular Mexican program "Mi barrio" (My Neighborhood) for almost two years.  

In her personal life, Mariana is married with actor Pablo Perroni and is the mother of two daughters, Shamadhi (from her first marriage) and Maria. 

In 2001 she released her only record as a solo artist, called "Todo Tiene Tambor". However her most remembered hit was "Alcanzar una Estrella" from the soap opera of same title.

Mariana during 2013 co-starred in Mentir para Vivir (Lying to Live), as Maria Jiménez Flores, Sebastián's mother, a "lunatic, suffers from epilepsy, dies because of tumor".

In 2017, Mariana joined the original founding members of Timbiriche (current line up includes original members Sasha Sokol, Benny Ibarra, Alix Bauer, Erik Rubin, Mariana Garza and Diego Schoening) to celebrate the 35th anniversary of the group. The tour will continue into 2018.

Discography with Timbiriche 
 Timbiriche (1982)
 La Banda Timbiriche (1982)
 La banda Timbiriche: En concierto (1983)
 Timbiriche Disco Ruido (1983)
 Timbiriche Vaselina (1984)
 Timbiriche Rock Show (1985)
 Timbiriche 7 (1987)
 En Concierto (1999)
 Somos Timbiriche 25 en Vivo (2007)
 Vivo En Vivo (2008)
 Timbiriche Juntos (2017)

Discography 
 Alcanzar Una Estrella (1990)
 Solidaridad (1991)
 Más que alcanzar una estrella (1992)
 Ellas cantan a Cri Cri (1999) 
 Todo tiene tambor (2001)

Filmography

Film
 Amor a la mexicana (1979)
 Más que alcanzar una estrella (1992)...Rosita
 Timbiriche: La misma piedra (2008)...Mariana Garza (Película de la historia de Timbiriche)

 Telenovelas 
 Elisa (1979)
 Dos vidas(1988)
 Flor a canela (1989)...Marianela
 Alcanzar una estrella (1990)...Lorena Caetano
 Alcanzar una estrella II (1991)...Lorena Caetano
 Tenías que ser tú (1993)...Santa
 [[A flor de piel (telenovela)|A flor de piel]] (1996)...Mariana
 [[Alborada (telenovela)|Alborada]] (2005)... Esperanza de Corsa de Manrique
 Mentir para Vivir (2013)... Maria Jimenez Flores

TV programs

 Hola México!! (1984) As Guest Star
 Mi Barrio (1990) As young host together Ricky Luis
 Las cosas simple (1993) 
 Timbiriche: El concierto (1998) (Reencuentro con Timbiriche)
 Hoy (1998) (Guest Star)
 Mujer casos de la vida real (Guest Star)
 Dilo, dilo VIP (2004) As Host
 Buscando a Timbiriche, la nueva banda (2007) (Reencuentro con Timbiriche)
 Como dice el dicho (2012) 2 Episodes

Theatre 

 La maravilla de crecer (1980)
 Vaselina (1984)
 Oz, el mago de Oz (1989)
 El soldadito de plomo (1993)
 Él y sus mujeres (1994)
 Todo tiene tambor (2000)
 Musical, "Regina" (2003)
 Yo madre, yo hija (2004)
 Musical "Pinocho" (2004)
 Sherezada (2005)
 Aquí y Ahora (2014)
 Los Monólogos de la Vagina (2014)

References

1970 births
Living people
Mexican actresses
Mexican women singers
Timbiriche members
Actresses from Mexico City
Singers from Mexico City